The Roots of My Raising is the 21st studio album by American country singer Merle Haggard and The Strangers, released in 1976. It was his third release in 1976 and his last on the Capitol label until his return in 2004. It reached number 8 on the Billboard country albums chart.

History
The album includes Haggard's last #1 hit of the decade, "Cherokee Maiden," a song written by Cindy Walker. It spent 11 weeks on the charts, reaching #1. The Tommy Collins-written title track had also gone to #1, Haggard's ninth consecutive chart topper stretching back to 1973 and twenty-third number one overall.  The album also features material originally recorded by Jimmie Rodgers and Lefty Frizzell, two of Haggard's biggest musical influences.

Reception

Thom Jurek of AllMusic enthuses that Haggard's final Capitol album was "a hell of a way to go out" and calls "What Have You Got Planned Tonight, Diana," "one of Haggard's most overlooked gems." In his essay for the 1994 Haggard box set Down Every Road, music journalist Daniel Cooper observes, "While the #1 hits had not dried up for Merle, and while he still had the power to slay on isolated non-hits like 'What Have You Got Planned Tonight, Diana,' his overall output the last years on Capitol had started to sound a bit uninspired."

Track listing
"The Roots of My Raising" (Tommy Collins)
"What Have You Got Planned Tonight, Diana" (Dave Kirby)
"Waltz You Saved for Me" (Gus Kahn, Wayne King, Emil Flindt)
"Walk on the Outside" (Kirby, Chuck Howard)
"Gambling Polka Dot Blues" (Jimmie Rodgers, Roy E. Hall)
"Cherokee Maiden" (Cindy Walker)
"Am I Standing in Your Way" (Merle Haggard)
"Colorado" (Kirby)
"I Never Go Around Mirrors" (Lefty Frizzell, Sanger D. Shafer)
"Mississippi Delta Blues" (Rodgers, Jack Neville)

Personnel
Merle Haggard– vocals, guitar

The Strangers:
Roy Nichols – lead guitar
Norman Hamlet – steel guitar, dobro
 Tiny Moore – mandolin
Eldon Shamblin– guitar
 Ronnie Reno – guitar
 Mark Yeary – piano
 James Tittle – bass
Biff Adam – drums
Don Markham – saxophone

With
 Dave Kirby – guitar
 Bobby Wayne – guitar
 Dennis Hromek – bass
 Johnny Gimble – fiddle

and
Hargus "Pig" Robbins – piano, organ
Glen D. Hardin – piano

Chart positions

References

1976 albums
Merle Haggard albums
Capitol Records albums
Albums produced by Ken Nelson (United States record producer)